The City of Flint has operated under at least four charters (1855, 1888, 1929, 1974).  
The City is currently run under its 2017  charter that gives the city a Strong Mayor form of government.  It is also instituted the appointed independent office of Ombudsman, while the city clerk is solely appointed by the City Council.  The City Council is composed of members elected from the city's nine wards.

The city was under the supervision of a state-appointed Receivership Transition Advisory Board from 2015 to January 2019.  The Receivership Transition Advisory Board had to review and rule on all financial matters approved by the city council and mayor.

In June 2018, an Administrative Hearings Bureau, or Blight Hearings Bureau, was started through a grant to handle blight hearings generated from blight citations given by the city's Blight Elimination Division. Attorney T.W. Feaster was appointed the first administrative hearing officer of the bureau. There were a backlog since 2013 of about 7,000 complaints.

Other principal officers
See Also Mayor of the City of Flint, Michigan

•In 1876, the office of City Recorder was abolished and replaced with a city council appointed city clerk.

1929 Charter
In 1929, the city adopted a new city charter with a council-manager form of government. In 1935, the city residents approved a charter amendment establishing the Civil Service Commission. The  three-member Civil Service Commission had complete control over all personal matters leaving the city manager powerless to hire and fire. The Commission powers were reduced in the 1974 charter.

Emergency manager

Ward officers

Council

1855 Charter

† To fill vacancy

1888 Charter

1929 Charter

1974 Charter

President and vice president are selected in November.

Receivership Transition Advisory Board
The Receivership Transition Advisory Board was appointed by Governor Snyder after the city exited direct control of the emergency manager in its second Financial emergency in Michigan.

Charter Review Commission

Supervisors
Supervisors represented the City on the Genesee County, Michigan Board of Supervisors.

Ombudsman
The City Ombudsman is a charter independent office of the city appointed by the City Council in a 2/3 votes to a seven-year term.  A police ombudsman, Richard Dicks, predated the current charter position and was appointed in 1969.

References

Flint, Michigan
Local government in Michigan